Mu Sheng (1368–1439), courtesy name Jingmao, was a Chinese military general and politician of the Ming dynasty.

Mu Sheng was the second son of Mu Ying, the first Marquis of Xiping. He was a solemn man of few words, and the Hongwu Emperor very liked him. In 1399, his elder brother Mu Chun died without heir, so Mu Sheng succeeded him as Marquis of Xiping.

Mu was dispatched to attack Vietnam together with Zhang Fu in 1406. In the next year, they captured the Vietnamese usurper Hồ Quý Ly, and his son Hồ Hán Thương. Vietnam was once again ruled by China and renamed to Jiaozhi province. For this accomplishment, he was elevated to the title "Duke of Qian".

In 1408, Trần Ngỗi, a Vietnamese prince, revolted against Ming China. Mu was dispatched to put down the rebellion, but was defeated. In the next year, Zhang Fu was sent to Vietnam again to support him. It proved that Mu was a general did not have military talents. Zhang captured Trần Ngỗi in 1410 successfully and came back to Nanjing, but Mu failed to put down the rebellion of the other prince, Trần Quý Khoáng, until Zhang Fu came to assist him again. They crushed the rebellion in 1414, and Mu was granted the title of Grand Tutor.

In 1426, he was sent to Vietnam again together with Liu Sheng to put down the rebellion of Lê Lợi, whom later became the founder of the Later Lê dynasty. Later, Liu was killed by the Vietnamese in Chi Lăng Pass, Mu had to retreat from Vietnam. Finally, the Xuande Emperor decided to abandon Jiaozhi Province, and the Vietnamese gained political independence once again.

Mu Sheng took part in the Luchuan–Pingmian campaigns together with Mu Ang and Fang Zheng. Fang Zheng was defeated and killed in action, Mu Sheng had to retreat. He died in Chuxiong. He was elevated to the title "Prince of Dingyuan" and given the posthumous name Zhongjing posthumously. His eldest son Mu Bin succeeded as Duke of Qian.

References

1368 births
1439 deaths
Generals from Anhui
Ming dynasty generals
Ming dynasty politicians
Politicians from Chuzhou